John Williams (died 29 November 1855) was an English Liberal Party politician.

He was elected at the 1847 general election as one of the two Members of Parliament (MPs) for the borough of Macclesfield in Cheshire, but was defeated at the 1852 general election by the Conservative Party candidate Edward Egerton.

References

External links 

Year of birth missing
1855 deaths
UK MPs 1847–1852
Liberal Party (UK) MPs for English constituencies
Place of birth missing
People from Macclesfield